Unlimited EP is the debut EP by American hip hop duo Soul Position. It was released on Rhymesayers Entertainment in 2002. The album was produced by RJD2 with all vocal duties being handled by Blueprint. "Oxford You Really Owe Me" is an instrumental track.

Track listing

References

External links
 on Rhymesayers Entertainment

2002 debut EPs
Soul Position albums
Rhymesayers Entertainment EPs